Kalyani Silpanchal railway station is a Kolkata Suburban Railway station on the Kalyani Simanta branch line of Sealdah railway division. It is situated at Shilpanchal Road, Kalyani in Nadia district in the Indian state of West Bengal. It serves Kalyani industrial areas.

History
The Calcutta (Sealdah)–Kusthia line of Eastern Bengal Railway was opened to run in the year of 1862. British Government in India established the railway station in the then Roosvelt town named Chandmari Halt in 1883. In 1954 it was renamed into Kalyani. In 1979, the rail line was extended from Kalyani main station to Kalyani Simanta railway station and also established direct connectivity to  through Kalyani Simanta local EMU trains.

References

External links

Sealdah railway division
Railway stations in Nadia district
Transport in Kalyani, West Bengal
Kolkata Suburban Railway stations